The Shire of Whitsunday was a local government area located in the North Queensland region of Queensland, Australia.

The area's economy is mainly based on tourism, and sugar is the main agricultural product.

History
The Shire of Proserpine was established from part of the Shire of Wangaratta on 19 January 1910 under the Local Authorities Act 1902.

On 18 February 1989, the Shire of Proserpine was renamed Shire of Whitsunday due to its inclusion of the popular Whitsunday Islands.

On 15 March 2008, under the Local Government (Reform Implementation) Act 2007 passed by the Parliament of Queensland on 10 August 2007, the Shire of Whitsunday reunited with the Shire of Bowen to form the Whitsunday Region.

Towns and localities
The Shire of Whitsunday included the following settlements:

 Proserpine
 Airlie Beach
 Andromache
 Brandy Creek
 Breadalbane
 Cannon Valley
 Cannonvale
 Cape Conway
 Cape Gloucester
 Conway
 Conway Beach
 Crystal Brook
 Daydream Island
 Dingo Beach
 Dittmer
 Flametree
 Foxdale

 Glen Isla
 Gloucester Island
 Goorganga Creek
 Goorganga Plains
 Gregory River
 Gunyarra
 Hamilton Island
 Hamilton Plains
 Hayman Island
 Hideaway Bay
 Jubilee Pocket
 Kelsey Creek
 Laguna Quays
 Lake Proserpine
 Lethebrook
 Mandalay

 Mount Julian
 Mount Marlow
 Mount Pluto
 Mount Rooper
 Myrtlevale
 Palm Grove
 Pauls Pocket
 Preston
 Riordanvale
 Shute Harbour
 Silver Creek
 Strathdickie
 Sugarloaf
 Thoopara
 Wilson Beach
 Woodwark

Chairmen
 1927: John Charles Edwards

Population

See also
 Whitsunday

References

Former local government areas of Queensland
2008 disestablishments in Australia
Populated places disestablished in 2008